The King Abdul Aziz Foundation for Human Sciences and Islamic Studies in Casablanca is a research library in Casablanca, Morocco for social and human sciences as well as Arab-Islamic studies. The foundation was established by Abdullah bin Abdulaziz Al Saud in 1985.

The complex includes a library, a media center, and a mosque, and it is located near the Atlantic coast on Ain Diab. The complex covers an area of approximately 15,000 m², and the library holds about a million titles in the fields of literature and the sciences, in a variety of languages in addition to lithographs, rare books, photographs, postage stamps, and academic papers. The foundation is a public use institution and publishes books and hosts conferences.

References 

Buildings and structures in Casablanca
All stub articles
Coordinates not on Wikidata